In the Afternoon is a studio album by American band L'Altra. It was released on Aesthetics on April 2, 2002.

Critical reception

At Metacritic, which assigns a weighted average score out of 100 to reviews from mainstream critics, the album received an average score of 70, based on 7 reviews, indicating "generally favorable reviews".

Matt Fink of AllMusic gave the album 4 stars out of 5, saying, "A rich tapestry of soothing aural textures, L'Altra's In the Afternoon is one of the first albums that could be referred to as residing in the realm of pastoral dream pop." He called it "An undeniably pleasant and ultimately rewarding, if not immediately accessible, listen."

Track listing

Personnel
Credits adapted from liner notes.

L'Altra
 Eben English – music, additional recording
 Ken Dyber – music, additional recording
 Joseph Costa – music, additional recording, photography
 Lindsay Anderson – music, additional recording

Additional personnel
 Marc Hellner – music
 Fred Lonberg-Holm – music
 Charles Kim – music
 Todd Mattei – music
 Steven Dvorak – music
 Cristian Huepe – music
 Robert Cruz – music
 Joe Grimm – music
 Nate Walcott – music
 Jeremy Lemos – recording, mixing
 Matt Murman – mastering

References

External links
 

2002 albums
L'Altra albums